Craig Nelson may refer to:

 Craig Nelson (cricketer) (born 1969), South African cricketer
 Craig Nelson (footballer) (born 1971), Scottish football goalkeeper
 Craig Richard Nelson (born 1947), American character actor
 Craig T. Nelson (born 1944), American actor